Embassy Row is an American television, global-based format, and digital production company based in New York City and a subsidiary of Sony Pictures Television. It was founded in 2005 by British television producer Michael Davies, the current executive producer of Sony's game show, Jeopardy! (though Embassy Row holds no current credit for that show).

History

Diplomatic Productions

Davies' first production company, Diplomatic Productions (or just Diplomatic), was founded on December 12, 2000 with the help of ABC and Disney. Davies was originally a senior vice president for Buena Vista Productions, who later joined ABC in February 1998 as executive vice president.

Embassy Row

On May 12, 2005, Davies joined forces with entertainment marketer Tera Banks and LivePlanet co-founder and former CEO Chris Moore to form a new company, Embassy Row. Diplomatic was immediately folded into the new company in the process.

In January 2009, Embassy Row was acquired by SPT, the two having signed a partnership deal three years prior in January 2006.

Titles by Embassy Row

Entertainment

Diplomatic

2 Minute Drill (ESPN 2000-2001)
Smush (USA 2001) (in association with Greengrass Productions, Jellyvision and USA)
Pepsi’s Play for a Billion (The WB 2003, ABC 2004) (in association with PepsiCo Beverages North America)
Studio 7 (The WB 2004) (in association with Monkey Entertainment)

Embassy Row

My Kind of Town (ABC, 2005; in association with Monkey Kingdom)
Chain Reaction (GSN, 2006–2007; in association with Sony Pictures Television and GSN)
Grand Slam (GSN, 2007; in association with Monkey Kingdom, Sony Pictures Television, and GSN)
The World Series of Pop Culture (VH1 2006-2007; in association with VH1)
Power of 10 (CBS, 2007-2008; in association with Sony Pictures Television)
The Newlywed Game (GSN 2009–2013; in association with Sony Pictures Television and GSN)
Make My Day (TV Land 2009; in association with Monkey Kingdom, Sony Pictures Television, and TV Land Originals)
Watch What Happens: Live (Bravo 2009–present)
Hidden Agenda (GSN 2010; in association with Sony Pictures Television and GSN)
The Glee Project (Oxygen 2011–2012)
Talking Dead (AMC, 2011–present)
Talking Bad (AMC, 2013)
The American Bible Challenge (GSN, 2012–2014; in association with Sony Pictures Television, Relativity Television, and GSN Originals)
The Substitute (2011–present; in association with Phear Creative and MTV Production Development)
Kathy (2012–2013; in association with Sony Pictures Television, Donut Run, and Bravo Originals)
The Pyramid (GSN 2012; ;in association with Sony Pictures Television and GSN Originals)
The Job (CBS 2013; in association with Sony Pictures Television)
Crowd Rules (CNBC, 2013)
Fashion Queens (Bravo 2013–2015, co-produced by True Entertainment and Bravo Originals)
Beat Bobby Flay (Food Network, 2013/2014–present; co produced by Rock Shrimp Productions)
Street Art Throwdown (Oxygen, 2015; co-produced by Pretty Ugly Productions)
Bianca (Syndicated, 2015; co-produced by Lucky Gal Productions)
The Grace Helbig Show (E!, 2015–present)
Recipe for Deception (Bravo, 2016–present; in association with Realizer Productions)
Comedy Knockout (trutv, 2016–present; in association with 3 Arts Entertainment)
Adam Carolla and Friends Build Stuff Live (Spike, 2017–present)
Beyond Stranger Things (Netflix, 2017–present)
 Unapologetic with Aisha Tyler (AMC, 2018)
Who Wants to Be a Millionaire (ABC, 2020–2021; co-produced by Kimmelot and Valleycrest Productions)
Kal Penn Approves This Message (Freeform, 2020–present)

Sports & reality

Fast Cars & Superstars: The Gillette Young Guns Celebrity Race (ABC 2007)
Good Morning Football (NFL Network, 2016–present)
The PDC US Open
The World Series of Darts
The World Darts Challenge
Garbage Time with Katie Nolan (FS1 2015-2017)
Barstool Van Talk (Pardon My Take presented by Barstool Sports 2017)

Factual

Boy Meets Grill (Food Network 2002–present)
Cutthroat Kitchen (Food Network 2013–2017)
In Search of Real Food
Real Food Cooking School
South Beach Food Fest

Digital & branded entertainment

American Idol Buzz Session
Hook Me Up (Yahoo! Tech 2006–present)
The 9 (Yahoo! 2006-2008)
Poptub (YouTube 2008–present)
Talent Show

Feature film

Once in a Lifetime: The Extraordinary Story of the New York Cosmos

Notes and references

External links
Official Site

2000 establishments in New York City
Mass media companies based in New York City
Mass media companies established in 2000
Television production companies of the United States
Sony Pictures Entertainment
Sony Pictures Television
Sony Pictures Television production companies